Kadir Kaan Özdemir (born 1 March 1998) is a Turkish professional footballer who plays as a left back for TFF Third League club Nevşehir Belediyespor.

Professional career
Kadir Kaan made his professional debut for Fenerbahçe S.K. in a 2-2 Turkish Cup tie with Gençlerbirliği S.K. on 18 January 2017. He briefly joined Tuzlaspor on loan in the TFF Second League in 2017, and thereafter signed with Konyaspor on 22 July 2017. He made his Süper Lig debut for Konyaspor in a 2-0 win over Kardemir Karabükspor on 11 December 2017.

References

External links
 
 
 
 Konyaspor Profile

1998 births
People from Üsküdar
Footballers from Istanbul
Living people
Turkish footballers
Turkey youth international footballers
Turkey under-21 international footballers
Association football defenders
Tuzlaspor players
Konyaspor footballers
1922 Konyaspor footballers
Bayrampaşaspor footballers
Kahramanmaraşspor footballers
Şanlıurfaspor footballers
Süper Lig players
TFF Second League players
TFF Third League players